A by-election was held for the New South Wales Legislative Assembly electorate of Central Cumberland on 29 August 1891 because of the death of Robert Ritchie.

Dates

Result

Robert Ritchie died.

See also
Electoral results for the district of Central Cumberland
List of New South Wales state by-elections

References

1891 elections in Australia
New South Wales state by-elections
1890s in New South Wales